Hassan Evan Naseem (1984 – September 19, 2003), commonly referred to as Evan Naseem, is the person whose death became a lever for the current, open, political reform activities in the Maldives. He was serving at Maafushi Prison for drug offences when he was beaten to death by the NSS personnel of the Security unit during a riot which endangered the lives of the prison security personnel.

Early life
Evan attended Majeediyya School for his secondary education. He was jailed several times for drug offences and other related crimes.

Dispute between inmates
On September 19, 2003, inmates of Evan Naseem's cell crossed the partitions, on two occasions, to assault a person named Ali Didi who was detained in a different cell. This incident was reported to Maafushi Jail Office by the security unit in writing, along with two separate lists of people who crossed the partitions. Evan's name was not on either of the lists. Later the same day Evan's fellow inmates were throwing objects at other cells. The Officer-in-Charge of the Maafushi Jail Security Unit, Captain Adam Mohamed, exaggerated the matter to police headquarters at Malé. Adam Mohamed was given permission to remove the "troublemakers" from the cell (where Evan was) and to keep them handcuffed. 

Later the same night a team of five security personnel came to Evan's cell with a list of people who were involved in assaulting Ali Didi and throwing objects at other cells. Though Evan's name was not on the list submitted earlier to Maafushi Jail Office, the new list included his name. As their names were read out, the men came out from the cell. When Evan's name was called out he refused to come out, saying he was not involved in any of the previous unrest or disputes. Upon his refusal one of the security personnel went into the cell and asked him to come out. He still refused to walk out and warned the security person not to come closer or touch him. The security man was attacked twice with a wooden plank as he went towards Evan. Soon after this incident, numerous members of the unit stormed into the cell. Evan then yieldingly walked out of the cell.

Death
After being removed from the cell, Evan was taken to a place called "Range" where he was kept separate from other inmates. There he was beaten up by 12 security personnel. He was beaten up with bare hands, wooden planks and riot batons. On various occasions he lost consciousness because of continuous beatings. 
When he no longer responded, he was taken to Indira Gandhi Memorial Hospital in the early morning of September 20, 2003. According to the medical reports he died on September 19, 2003, 2320hrs due to injuries sustained to his lungs.

Unrest

Inmates of Evan Naseem learned of his death the same day. This resulted in a protest which then lead to unrest in Maafushi Prison. To control this unrest NSS personnel at Maafushi shot several unarmed prisoners killing 3 and injuring 17 others.

News of the death of Evan broke out quickly in the capital city Malé. A large number of people gathered at his burial service. While people were at the cemetery, news of the shooting incident reached the already angry public. Civil unrest in Malé grew with this news. Several police stations were set on fire, government buildings were attacked, and government vehicles were set on fire or destroyed by the angry mob. The government controlled the unrest by around 2300hrs and declared a State of Emergency, for the first time in the country's history, in Malé and nearby islands. A curfew was imposed in Malé.

Investigation
President Maumoon Abdul Gayoom established a Presidential Commission on September 20, 2003 to investigate the death of Evan Naseem and the shooting incident at Maafushi Prison. The findings of the commission were released to the public with the title "Report on the Death of Hassan Evan Naseem". However, several sections from the public report were omitted due to national security concerns.

External links
Report on the Death of Hassan Evan Naseem
presidencymaldives.gov.mv
web.amnesty.org

1984 births
2003 deaths
Deaths by beating
Maldivian people who died in prison custody
Prisoners who died in Maldivian detention